The 1964 Georgia Tech Yellow Jackets football team represented the Georgia Institute of Technology during the 1964 NCAA University Division football season. The Yellow Jackets were led by 20th-year head coach Bobby Dodd, and played their home games at Grant Field in Atlanta. They competed as independents for the first time since 1920, after dropping from the Southeastern Conference in 1963.

Schedule

Source:

References

Georgia Tech
Georgia Tech Yellow Jackets football seasons
Georgia Tech Yellow Jackets football